Unionbank (Bulgarian: Юнионбанк, Yunionbank) was a major Bulgarian retail and commercial bank with headquarters in Sofia.

As of  the end of 2010, its assets amounted to over €1.7 billion and growing, while the share capital of the bank exceeded €158 million.
Unionbank has 55 active branch locations around the country. As of January 2011, the bank has a long-term credit rating of BBB+ from the Fitch credit agency.

History
MKB Unionbank was founded in January 1991 as Boras OOD, a limited liability company, licensed by the Bulgarian National Bank (BNB) to trade in foreign currencies. Boras OOD founded, as a subsidiary company, a financial brokerage house Sofia AD, licensed by BNB as a non-banking financial institution. Sofia AD was renamed and licensed as a commercial bank as Unionbank AD and received a full banking license in 1996. 

In September 2002, the European Bank for Reconstruction and Development (EBRD) acquired 15% of Unionbank's capital. 

In December 2005, MKB Bank acquired 60% of Unionbank's capital and renamed it to MKB Unionbank in May 2006. 

In September 2009, MKB Bank increased its percentage in the share capital of MKB Unionbank with 34% to 94% by buying all shares of Boras OOD.

In July 2012 Fitch has confirmed MKB Unionbank's long-term credit rating at BBB+.

In August 2013 First Investment Bank buys MKB Unionbank.

Key people
MKB Unionbank has a tiered board structure, which includes a Management Board and a Supervisory Board.

Management Board
 Maria Ilieva – CEO, Chairman of the Management Board

Supervisory Board
 Imre Balogh – Chairman of the Supervisory Board

Subsidiaries
According to the MKB Unionbank website, MKB Unionbank has one wholly owned subsidiary - AMC Imoti, a real estate operation, property valuation, and investment development, and property management company.

Key figures
 Client deposits: €860 million (end 2010)
 Client loans: €1.11 billion (end 2010)
 Branches: 55 (end 2010)

References

External links

 
 Bulgarian National Bank
 Financial Supervision Commission

Cooperative banks of Bulgaria
Banks established in 1991
Bulgarian companies established in 1991
Defunct banks of Bulgaria
Banks disestablished in 2014
2014 disestablishments in Bulgaria